The Dublin Link is a pedestrian and bicycle bridge over the Scioto River in Dublin, Ohio. The bridge is the only single-tower S-shaped suspension bridge in the world. The bridge connects Dublin's historic district and downtown on the west bank with the Bridge Street District partially complete, on the east bank.

The bridge was originally proposed in 1986, and re-proposed in 2007. After planning, studies, and design efforts, construction began in 2017. The bridge was completed and opened on 17 March 2020, with a planned ceremony on March 13, cancelled due to the ongoing COVID-19 pandemic.

Attributes

The bridge's deck passes through the main tower's keyhole. The deck is S-shaped, meant to echo the river's path through the city. It was also designed that way to connect Rock Cress Parkway on the west bank with Bridge Park Avenue on the east, roads that do not directly line up.

The bridge's name was chosen after feedback from about 1,400 Dublin residents. Hundreds suggested "The Link" or similar terms because of the bridge's connectivity between the historic and new portions of Dublin along with the two sides of the river.

The bridge will connect two portions of park space, together known as Riverside Crossing Park. The  park will include a pavilion, upper and lower terraces, lawns, seating areas, waterfall features, a play space, and bike racks. The park's paths will connect into Dublin's trail system. The upper portion of the park was completed in late 2020, while the remainder was to be completed by 2022.

History
In 1986, Dublin's city council approved a plan to develop a riverfront park, including a suspension bridge over the Scioto River. The first design was proposed in 2007 in a community plan approved by the council. The council and commission members visited Liberty Bridge in Greenville, South Carolina in 2008 to learn about the pedestrian bridge the city built. From 2009 to 2013, planning, feasibility studies, and work sessions took place. In 2015, the bridge cost was estimated at $18.225 million, though the project budget was approved later that year for $22.438 million. Construction began in February 2017 with a planned cost of $22.75 million and projected opening in 2019. Architecture and conceptual engineering design was completed by Endrestudio, with T. Y. Lin International as the engineer of record. In 2019, the bridge's shoring towers were removed, first suspending the bridge. The bridge was set to open in a ceremony on March 13, 2020, with a light show, live music, and group painting activity. The event was cancelled on March 6 for public safety amidst the ongoing COVID-19 pandemic.

References

External links

 Construction updates and webcam The Webcam is no longer active.

2020 establishments in Ohio
Bridges completed in 2020
Bridges over the Scioto River
Concrete bridges in Ohio
Dublin, Ohio
Pedestrian bridges in Ohio
Steel bridges in the United States
Suspension bridges in Ohio